Vasily Prokofyevich Yefanov (Samara – March 3, 1978, Moscow) was a Soviet and Russian painter and pedagogue. People's Painter of the USSR (1965).

Selected works
The (An) Unforgettable Meeting, 1934.
A Street Fight, 1942.
Portrait of Pyotr Leonidovich Kapitsa, 1958.

References

1900 births
1978 deaths
20th-century Russian painters
People from Samara, Russia
Communist Party of the Soviet Union members
Full Members of the USSR Academy of Arts
People's Artists of the USSR (visual arts)
Stalin Prize winners
Recipients of the Order of the Red Banner of Labour
Russian male painters
Soviet painters
Burials at Kuntsevo Cemetery